ESTIEM (European Students of Industrial Engineering and Management) is a non-profit, non-governmental and non-political student organisation that connects European students that combine technological understanding with management skills. The goal of this organisation is to establish and foster relations between students across Europe and support them in their professional and personal development.
As of August 2020, the ESTIEM network counts over 8.000 members that are registered in 74 universities of 27 countries.

ESTIEM's has its seat in Eindhoven, Netherlands

History 
The idea of the network was created during the WIFO 1990 seminar that was held in Darmstadt in January 1990. During the mentioned meeting participants from Darmstadt, Dresden, Graz, Helsinki and Karlsruhe decided to integrate a network of IEM Students and graduates to "enhance communication and co-operation". This network was called EAIM (European Association of Industrial Management). In November 1990 the statute of ESTIEM was signed in Berlin by representatives of 14 student groups from 6 countries. ESTIEM is an official student organisation registered in Eindhoven, since 1995.

Today 
Annually, ESTIEM delivers over 150 European wide events to its membership of over 8.000 students. These events aim to support students in their personal and professional development by educating them in: Soft skills, IEM Seminars, Case Study competitions and Entrepreneurship. ESTIEM publishes two Magazines annually that claim to provide insight into "forward-looking topics" in Industrial Engineering and Management, the print run is approximately 3000 copies.

Structure 

The network consists of its Local Groups, which function as independent entities connected to IEM study programmes at universities over Europe. The purpose of the central level is to support the Local Groups in their activities.

The central level 

 The Board of ESTIEM which is the core managing and responsible body of the organisation. It is constituted of six students who are being elected every spring.
 Committees, their task is to support the Board on operational tasks in specific areas of its responsibility.
 Projects That are responsible to support Local Groups when organising an event and to provide services to students.

Council meetings 
The decision-making body of the network is the General Assembly, which meets twice a year in autumn and in spring at the Council Meeting. Each university, represented by its so called "local Group", sends two student representatives.

Benefits for students 

ESTIEM offers students opportunities to develop themselves, including seminars, case study competitions, summer academies and training. These activities are set in an intercultural context, where individuals may find that different mentalities challenges their way of thinking. Making friends and exploring Europe by participating in European wide events that encourages open-mindedness, paving the way for friendships and a network of future colleagues across borders.

Local groups 

Local Groups are being divided into Regions in ESTIEM, every Region has a Regional Coordinator that is responsible to ensure the communication and cooperation among the members.

ESTIEM Board

International projects 

The ESTIEM network created and supports 9 international project. These projects aim to train and educate students via international events that take place in ESTIEM's Local Groups, or by providing services such as the ESTIEM Magazine - Student Guide.

 Academic Days is an event developed to provide insights and understanding of IEM related topics in which the hosting university excels in, guided by an academic mentor.
 BrainTrainer provides soft and business skills such as communication, presentation, negotiation and team-management.
 businessbooster is an ESTIEM Project that promotes and stimulates entrepreneurship among students by organizing different training, educational and networking events and competitions.
Language Programme is created to improve the communication within ESTIEM. It is focused on the different languages shared in the community. With its online and offline offerings, it aims to contribute to the language learning skills of members.
 Europe3D gathers students from all around the world in a 5–7 days seminar series, where the participants get to learn more about three distinct dimensions of a country: politics, economy and culture.
 ESTIEM Magazine is the official publication of ESTIEM It is published twice a year and distributed at Council Meetings. The run of 3 000 magazines reaches 81 universities in 31 European countries.
 Summer Academy The focus is developing the competence of creative leadership by engaging in open discussion, group work, debate and private study under a senior Academic Leader
 TIMES The Tournament In Management and Engineering Skills is the largest pan-European case study competition for Industrial Engineering and Management students. This event has been organised since 1994 and attracts over 250 teams each year. 
 Vision This Project is a seminar series on a yearly topic. In 2016 the Focus Topic was: Renewable Energies.

Partner organisations 
In September 2014, ESTIEM counts three collaborations with Student Organisations:

VWI (Verband Deutscher Wirtschaftsingenieure)
IFISO (Informal Forum of International Student Organisations)

Other collaborations with ESTIEM:

EPIEM (European Professors of Industrial Engineering and Management)
IISE (Institute of Industrial & System Engineers)

References

External links 
 ESTIEM Portal
 ESTIEM Magazine
 About ESTIEM
 Event page

European student organizations
Organisations based in North Brabant
Student organizations established in 1990
International organisations based in the Netherlands
Student organisations in the Netherlands